Antônio Teodoro dos Santos Filho (born 29 May 1965), commonly known as Toninho dos Santos or simply Toninho, is a former footballer who played as a forward. He was nicknamed El Bíblico ("The Biblical").

Early life 
Toninho was born on 29 May 1965 in Ivaiporã, Paraná, Brazil, to Antonio and Marcilia; he has five siblings. Aged 14, he began his youth career at Athletico Paranaense. Toninho played for various other local clubs, before joining Luis Ángel Firpo in El Salvador.

Club career 
Nicknamed El Bíblico ("The Biblical"), Toninho began his senior career at Salvadoran Luis Ángel Firpo, playing there between 1988 and 1989. In 1989 he moved to Costa Rican club Herediano, before moving back to Luis Ángel Firpo in 1990. Between 1990 and 1992 Toninho played for Mexican club América; he helped them lift the 1991 Copa Interamericana against Olimpia from Paraguay.

Between 1992 and 1993 he played for Deportivo Cali in Colombia, then for Colo-Colo in Chile in 1994, scoring 28 goals in 50 games in all competitions and helping the team win the 1994 Copa Chile. Toninho played for Puebla in Mexico and Tolima in Colombia in 1995, then for Colombian teams Junior, Deportivo Cali, and Bucaramanga 1996. In 1997 Toninho moved to his native Brazil, playing for Fluminense.

In 1997 Toninho moved from South America to the Middle East, playing for Saudi club Al-Ittihad 1997–98, Emirati club Al-Jazira in 1998–99, Lebanese club Al-Ansar in 1999–2000, and Qatari club Al-Gharafa in 2000–01. He returned to South America in 2002, playing for Águila in El Salvador until 2003, before playing for Blooming in Bolivia in 2004, where he retired.

Personal life 
Toninho has two children: Bruno, born in Mexico, and Janahyna. Following his retirement as a player in 2004, he opened his shoe business named "Tomate Azul".

As of 2020, Toninho was in the process of acquiring Salvadoran nationality.

Honours 
América
 Copa Interamericana: 1991

Colo-Colo
 Copa Chile: 1994

Ansar
 Lebanese Federation Cup: 1999
 Lebanese Super Cup: 1999

Individual
 Lebanese Premier League top scorer: 1999–2000

Notes

References

External links 
 
 Toninho dos Santos at Globo Esporte's Futpédia

1965 births
Living people
Association football forwards
Sportspeople from Paraná (state)
Brazilian footballers
Brazilian emigrants to El Salvador
Brazilian expatriate footballers
Club Athletico Paranaense players
C.D. Luis Ángel Firpo footballers
Club América footballers
Colo-Colo footballers
Club Puebla players
Fluminense FC players
C.D. Águila footballers
Club Blooming players
Deportivo Cali footballers
Al Ansar FC players
Chilean Primera División players
Liga MX players
Lebanese Premier League players
Expatriate footballers in Chile
Expatriate footballers in Mexico
Expatriate footballers in Bolivia
Expatriate footballers in Colombia
Expatriate footballers in El Salvador
Expatriate footballers in Lebanon
Association football midfielders
Brazilian expatriate sportspeople in Lebanon
Lebanese Premier League top scorers